Orania trispatha is a species of flowering plant in the family Arecaceae. It is found only in Madagascar. It is threatened by habitat loss.

References

trispatha
Flora of Madagascar
Critically endangered plants
Taxonomy articles created by Polbot
Taxa named by John Dransfield
Taxa named by Natalie Whitford Uhl